Tomcat may refer to:

Animals 
 A sexually mature male cat

Science and technology 
 Apache Tomcat, an implementation of Java web-server technologies
 Beretta 3032 Tomcat, a pistol
 Grumman F-14 Tomcat, a fighter aircraft
 Kawasaki Tomcat ZX-10, a motorcycle
 Rover 200 Coupé, a car
 TOMCAT/SLIMCAT, a chemical transport model
 Waspair HM 81 Tomcat, an ultralight aircraft

Media 
 Tom Cat, a character from the animated series Tom and Jerry
 Tom Cat (album), a 1981 album by Lee Morgan
 Tom Cat (band), a Japanese band who contributed to the Fist of the North Star soundtrack
 Tomcat (comics), DC Comics character, son of Wildcat
 Tomcat (video game), a 1989 computer game published in the UK by Players Software
 Tomcats (1977 film), a 1977 rape-and-revenge film
 Tomcats (2001 film), a 2001 comedy film
 The Tomcats, Brian Setzer's first rockabilly music group
 TomKat, a portmanteau for celebrity couple Tom Cruise and Katie Holmes
 Tomcat (2016 film), a 2016 Austrian film
 Talking Tom, a character in Outfit7's Talking Tom and Friends media franchise
 Tom, a cat villager from the Animal Crossing series of video games.